Aleksander Habela (born 10 May 1933) is a Polish bobsledder. He competed in the two-man and the four-man events at the 1956 Winter Olympics.

References

1933 births
Living people
Polish male bobsledders
Olympic bobsledders of Poland
Bobsledders at the 1956 Winter Olympics
Sportspeople from Nowy Sącz